Royal Joh. Enschedé is a printer of security documents, stamps and banknotes based in Haarlem, Netherlands. Joh. Enschedé specialises in print, media and security. The company hosted the Museum Enschedé until 1990 and has branches in Amsterdam, Brussels and Haarlem.

History
The company was founded in 1703, when Izaak Enschedé registered with the Printers Guild in Haarlem.

Joh. Enschedé has long been associated with the printing of banknotes; the company printed the "Robin", the very first Dutch banknote, in 1814. Since then, Joh. Enschedé has printed the banknotes of the State of the Netherlands. In 1866, after the death of Johannes Enschedé III, Joh. Enschedé sold the family's book collection and began printing stamps.

Typefounding
Enschedé began manufacturing type in 1743 after purchasing the foundry of Hendrik Wetstein, and the foundry soon became the most important part of Enschedé’s business. The famous punch-cutter Joan Michael Fleischman was employed there in the eighteenth century. Its type business flourished throughout the eighteenth and nineteenth centuries, and in the twentieth century the foundry achieved widespread international acclaim through the design and production of types of Jan van Krimpen.  During the foundry type era, Enschedé types were distributed in the United States by Continental Type Founders Association.

Foundry typefaces
These foundry types were produced by Enschedé:

Enschedé produced many other typefaces with matrices from other typefoundries for handsetting:

Many Monotype faces were cast on Monotype machines and delivered to the customers.

Besides all this Enschedé offered in the 1968 character proof:
 Monotype faces in small corpses:

 Monophoto 

 Linotype
Baskerville, 11D, 10D, 9D, 8D
Spartan (typeface), 14D, 12D, 10D, 9pt, 8D, 6D
Times New Roman, 11D, 10D, 9D, 7D, 5,5D 
Times New Roman Bold, 11D, 10D, 9D, 8D, 7D, 6D
 Intertype faces.
Folio Grotesk 230, 12D, 10D, 9D, 8D, 6D
Folio Grotesk half bold 228, 12D, 10D, 9D, 8D, 6D

Anniversaries

In 1893 for their 150th anniversary, a memorial book was commissioned called Enschedé gedenkschrift 1743-1893. The book was such a success that ten years later they decided to open a museum with artefacts from their archives, and in 1904 Museum Enschedé was founded in the old type foundry.

In 1978, to celebrate their 275th anniversary, Enschedé commissioned Bram de Does, one of Holland’s leading typographers, to design a digital typeface specifically for phototypesetting. The result was Trinité, a face which clearly shows its provenance and which continues the tradition of type design established at Enschedé so many years before.

During the celebrations for the company's 300th anniversary of Joh. Enschedé in 2003, the company received the designation "Royal" from Queen Beatrix.

Services
Today Joh. Enschedé specialises in security document design and printing (banknotes, postage stamps, parking permits, etc.), commercial print (annual reports, catalogues) and online document publication.

The company is a certified Euro banknotes printer, and produces euro notes for five EU countries.

Joh. Enschedé prints stamps for more than sixty countries.

Controversies
In 2016 reports emerged of the theft of 'a significant sum' of 50 euro notes at Joh. Enschedé during the course of two years. According to Dutch police, the theft was committed by several employees of the company.

References
Enschedé, Letterproef vsn de drukkerij, Haarlem/Holland, 1968
Jaspert, W. Pincus, W. Turner Berry and A.F. Johnson. The Encyclopedia of Type Faces. Blandford Press Lts.: 1953, 1983. .
Friedl, Ott, and Stein, Typography: an Encyclopedic Survey of Type Design and Techniques Throughout History. Black Dog & Levinthal Publishers: 1998. .

External links

Joh. Enschedé Amsterdam department
Joh. Enschedé IT & Consultancy
Joh. Enschedé Belgium department 
Joh. Enschedé online publication platform

Historical materials:

 Proef van letteren, Enschedé type specimen of 1768. An annotated edition with commentary has also been published authored by John A. Lane. Many fonts are by Fleischmann. Also lower-quality scan on Google Books
 Proeve van letteren, Enschedé type specimen of 1825. 
 Lyst der pryzen van alle uitmuntende letteren, door wylen den heer J.M. Fleischman (historic price list)
 Dutch Typefounders Specimens, Lane, Lommen & de Zoete - material on the history of Enschedé in the eighteenth century

 
Haarlem
Metal companies of the Netherlands
Banknote printing companies
Letterpress font foundries of the Netherlands
Philately of the Netherlands
Companies based in North Holland